Rich Man's Woman is the first album by Elkie Brooks.

Background
Brooks' first solo album was released in 1975 with publicity including a promotional week at Ronnie Scott's Jazz Club in London. The picture sleeve featuring a semi-naked Brooks was controversial.

Despite an initial marketing campaign, both A&M and Elkie decided to stop promoting the work and to focus on her follow-up album, Two Days Away.

The album has been released on CD, coupled with its successor Two Days Away.

Single releases
 "Where Do We Go From Here" (1975)
 "He's a Rebel" (1975)

Details
 Recorded 1975 at The Record Plant in Los Angeles, USA. Mastered at A&M Recording Studios in Hollywood, USA.
 Issued on vinyl and cassette in 1975 through A&M Records. Re-released in 1985 on CD, vinyl and cassette through Pickwick Records.
 Rich Man's Woman failed to enter the UK album charts.

Track listing 
All tracks composed by Elkie Brooks; except where indicated

 "Where Do We Go From Here (Rich Man's Woman)" – 3:45
 "Take Cover" (Michael Brown, Ian Lloyd) – 3:03
 "Jigsaw Baby" (Brooks, Bruce Foster) – 5:18
 "Roll Me Over" – 3:02
 "He's a Rebel" (Gene Pitney) – 2:55
 "One Step on the Ladder" – 5:24
 "Rock and Roll Circus" (Bob Segarini) – 4:21
 "Try a Little Love" – 3:54
 "Tomorrow" (David Courtney, Leo Sayer) – 3:59

Personnel
Elkie Brooks – vocals
Steve Burgh - guitars
Bruce Foster - keyboards
David Kemper - drums
Dennis Kovarik - bass
Additional personnel
David Paich - piano, keyboards
Michael Boddicker - synthesizers
Ben Benay - guitars
Max Bennett - bass guitar
Alan and Gene Estes - percussion
John Guerin - drums
Nino Tempo - saxophone
Stan Farber, Venetta Fields, Gerry Garrett, Jim Gilstrap, Ron Hicklin, Clydie King, Gene Marford, Verlene Rogers, Jenny Whitman - backing vocals
Dominic Frontiere, Larry Wilcox - arrangement
Technical
Warren Dewey, Bob Merritt, Doug Rider - engineering
Bernie Grundman - mastering
Kenny Kerner & Richie Wise - production

1975 debut albums
Elkie Brooks albums
A&M Records albums